The JNR Class C63 was a 2-6-2 steam locomotive proposed by Japanese National Railways (JNR). Designed in 1956 by Hideo Shima it was based on the Class C58. But none of these locomotives were ever actually built.

Background
The planning of the JNR Class C63 began around 1955.  Electrification for the locomotive developed slowly due to financial difficulties at JNR. The company was not experienced with diesel locomotives, and it lacked test facilities for non-steam engines. Development of the new diesel locomotive was proposed because existing models were aging and travel demand was increasing.

Cancellation

In 1956, the design drawing was completed. A prototype was to be manufactured, and a manufacturing order was to be issued.

In 1958, JNR, in its "Power Modernization Plan", planned to eliminate the steam locomotive in 15 years from fiscal year 1960. JNR authorized the implementation of the plan and completed it in 1975. Since JNR had converted to the policy of abolishing the steam locomotive, the company decided to cancel the C63.

At the Koriyama Plant (currently the Koriyama General Vehicle Center), a 1/5-scale live steam replica was produced based on the design documents, mainly to demonstrate the steam locomotive technology to the young staff; the miniature is currently used during special events. In addition to models being exhibited on the first floor of Koriyama Station, models are also displayed in the exhibition room of the Kyoto Railway Museum, alongside the number plate of C63 1 painted in vermilion.

See also
 Japan Railways locomotive numbering and classification
JNR Class C12
JNR Class C58

References
 
 

1067 mm gauge locomotives of Japan
Steam locomotives of Japan
2-6-2 locomotives